Allan Eugene Sims (born April 18, 1953) is a Canadian former professional hockey player and head coach in the National Hockey League (NHL). He played ten seasons in the NHL between 1973 and 1983 with the Boston Bruins, Hartford Whalers, Los Angeles Kings. He featured in three Stanley Cup Finals with the Bruins (1974, 1977, 1978).

After retiring he turned to coaching, and remained in this role from 1988 to 2016 in various minor leagues. Sims also served as the head coach of the San Jose Sharks in the NHL during the 1996-97 season.

Playing career
In 1972, Sims was the first-round (and first-ever) draft pick of the New York Raiders of the World Hockey Association, but chose to sign with the Boston Bruins who had drafted him in the third round. At Cornwall, Ontario, in Junior Hockey he had played with Bob Murray, a rushing defenceman.  When he played for Boston he was paired for two years with the greatest rushing defenceman of all time, Bobby Orr. He played for Boston and its American Hockey League affiliate for six seasons, and then for the Hartford Whalers for the next two.

Coaching career
After Sims' retirement from the NHL, he played and coached hockey with Fife Flyers in Scotland. Later he coached in the International League and won the Turner Cup with the Fort Wayne Komets in 1993.  Sims was named assistant coach under Ron Wilson with the Mighty Ducks of Anaheim 1993-1996 before he became head coach of the San Jose Sharks for the 1996–97 NHL season.

Sims then became head coach of the Milwaukee Admirals of the IHL for three years, from 1998 to 2000, moved on to the Central Hockey League for four years and to the Wilkes-Barre/Scranton Penguins as an assistant coach for a year. In 2007–2008, Sims coached the Fort Wayne Komets of the new IHL to his second Turner Cup championship, beating the Port Huron Icehawks 4 games to 3 after a triple-OT seventh and deciding game. After that, he led them to another Turner Cup in the 2008–09 season. In the following year (2009–10), Sims led the Komets to their third straight (and his personal fourth straight, counting the 1992–93 season) Turner Cup.  With the team returning to the CHL after the IHL dissolved, it was eliminated in the second round of the 2010-11 postseason before winning the league in 2011–12. However, the Komets failed to make the postseason in 2012–13, with the team in the ECHL, his final season as their head coach. Sims' final minor league head coaching job came with the Evansville IceMen of the ECHL; he took over during the 2014–15 season and coached them in 2015–16, failing to make the postseason either year. The team was declared dormant in 2016–17 in preparation for moving elsewhere, which turned out to be Jacksonville, Florida in 2017–18, and a new head coach took over.

Career statistics

Regular season and playoffs

NHL coaching statistics

Personal
Sims' son Tyler was the starting goaltender of the Providence College Friars in Hockey East, and a reserve goalie for several minor league teams between 2007–08 and 2010–11.

References

External links
 

1953 births
Living people
Anaheim Ducks coaches
Boston Bruins draft picks
Boston Bruins players
Canadian expatriate ice hockey players in Switzerland
Canadian expatriate ice hockey players in Germany
Canadian expatriate ice hockey players in Scotland
Canadian ice hockey coaches
Canadian ice hockey defencemen
Canadian people of English descent
Cornwall Royals (QMJHL) players
EV Landshut players
Fife Flyers players
Hartford Whalers players
Eishockey-Bundesliga players
Los Angeles Kings players
New Haven Nighthawks players
New York Golden Blades draft picks
Rochester Americans players
San Jose Sharks coaches
Ice hockey people from Toronto
Canadian expatriate ice hockey players in the United States